Sege  is one of the constituencies represented in the Parliament of Ghana. It elects one Member of Parliament (MP) by the first past the post system of election. Sege is located in the Dangme East district  of the Greater Accra Region of Ghana.

Boundaries
The seat is located within the Dangme East District of the Greater Accra Region of Ghana. It was formed prior to the 2004 December presidential and parliamentary elections by the division of the old Ada constituency into the new Sege and Ada constituencies.

Members of Parliament

Elections

See also
List of Ghana Parliament constituencies

References 

Parliamentary constituencies in the Greater Accra Region